Wynn Resorts, Limited is an American publicly traded corporation based in Paradise, Nevada, that is a developer and operator of high-end hotels and casinos. It was founded in 2002 by former Mirage Resorts Chairman and CEO Steve Wynn, and is now run by CEO Craig Billings. , the company has developed six properties.

History
In 2000, Steve Wynn agreed to sell Mirage Resorts to MGM Grand, after having led Mirage and its predecessors since 1973.  Wynn laid the foundation for his next venture that same year, buying the Desert Inn for $270 million.

Wynn found an early partner in Japanese billionaire Kazuo Okada of Universal Entertainment Corporation. Wynn, together with Universal subsidiary Aruze USA, controlled almost half the stock, making it harder for outside investors to exert control, as they had done at Mirage in response to Wynn's prolific spending.

Wynn hired investment banker Ronald Kramer as president and director in 2002 in order to help take the company public and oversee its expansion.

Wynn Resorts made its initial public offering on NASDAQ on October 25, 2002. The company's first project, Wynn Las Vegas, opened on April 28, 2005.

Wynn Macau, the company's second project started construction on June 28, 2004. It opened September 5, 2006 and is now the largest-grossing casino in the region.

Encore, an extension to Wynn Las Vegas, broke ground on April 28, 2006, the first anniversary of the opening of Wynn Las Vegas. Encore at Wynn Macau, the company's second project on the Macau Peninsula, Macau, People's Republic of China, opened on April 21, 2010. A second resort in Macau, Wynn Palace in Cotai, opened August 22, 2016.

Wynn bought  in Cotai, Macau where he hoped to break ground in 2012 for Wynn Cotai for a 2013 or early 2014 opening.

The company considered opening a casino as part of the Entertainment City development in the Philippines, but decided against it because of corruption in the country's gaming industry. Okada decided to proceed with the project alone, leading to the rupture of his partnership with Wynn. The dispute went public with reciprocal accusations of corrupt practices. Wynn and his allies accused Okada of bribing Philippines gaming regulators with over $110,000 in benefits, including free nights in a luxury suite at Wynn Las Vegas, while Okada claimed that Wynn Resorts' record $135 million donation to the University of Macau constituted a bribe. Okada resigned as vice chairman in October 2011, and the following February, after a company investigation by the Freeh Group confirmed the charges against him, the board of directors forced Aruze USA to sell back its shares at a nearly 30% discount. Aruze had been the company's largest shareholder, with a 19.7% stake.

On September 17, 2014, the Massachusetts Gaming Commission voted to approve Wynn Resorts' proposed $1.6 billion casino to be located in Everett, Massachusetts on the Mystic River, just north of Boston. This project will be known as Encore Boston Harbor and was scheduled to open in 2019.

On February 6, 2018, Steve Wynn resigned as CEO of the company amidst sexual allegations and was replaced by Matthew Maddox. Amid sexual harassment lawsuits involving directors, Maddox announced the planned departure of two board members, Ray Irani and Alvin Shoemaker, on March 7, 2018. The departure of Irani and Shoemaker was to reassure investors that the corporate culture was changing. In April 2018, the company nominated three women to the board of directors: Dee Dee Myers, Betsy Atkins, and Wendy Webb.

Talks between Wynn and Crown Resorts of Australia for a $7.1 billion offer collapsed in April 2019; analysts saw the bid as an attempt to diversify away from Macau, where its license may expire in 2022.

On May 28, 2019, Wynn paid a $ 35 million fine to the Massachusetts Gaming Commission and the $500,000 fine placed on Matthew Maddox.

On November 9, 2021, Wynn announced that Matthew Maddox would be stepping down as CEO on January 31, 2022. Craig Billings was named as successor to Maddox. Previously, Craig Billings was the CEO of Wynn Interactive and former CFO of Wynn Resorts. Billings assumed the role of CEO effective February 1, 2022.

Economic performance
The Encore in Las Vegas opened shortly after the beginning of the Great Recession. Despite the additional casino at the Encore (which added 97 tables and 857 slot machines to the original 190 tables and 2000 slots), net casino revenues for the combined resort were initially lower. Similarly, in the first quarter of 2009, net revenues of the Macau operations declined. Following the global economic recovery, performance of the Wynn properties also recovered. Wynn remained the only gaming operator to not perform mass layoffs during the recession. In 2017 CNBC reported that Wynn's stock was up 44% for the year and that Wynn's Macau operations were the leading US-based resorts there. In order to be able to resume operations of the hotel and casino despite the pandemic, Matt Maddox, CEO of Wynn Resorts, is requiring that all employees who choose not to receive a COVID-19 vaccination be tested weekly for the virus.

Properties

Properties in the United States

Las Vegas Strip, Nevada

Everett, Massachusetts

Properties in China

Macau

Planned properties

Ras al Khaimah, UAE

Former properties

Las Vegas Strip, Nevada

References

External links

2002 establishments in Nevada
2002 initial public offerings
Companies based in Paradise, Nevada
Gambling companies established in 2002
Hospitality companies established in 2002
Companies listed on the Nasdaq
Gambling companies of the United States
Hospitality companies of the United States
Sexual harassment in the United States
Steve Wynn